Li Xiaopeng (born 7 June 1959) is a Chinese businessman and politician, who is serving as the Minister of Transport. He is the former chief executive of China Huaneng Group, a power generation company. He was also Governor of Shanxi between 2012 and 2016. As the son of former Chinese Premier Li Peng, he is a prominent member of the faction known in Chinese politics as the princelings.

Early life and career
On 7 June 1959, Li was born at the Peking Union Medical College Hospital in Dong Cheng District, Beijing, The eldest son from three children of Li Peng, an electrical engineer, and Zhu Lin, a Russian-language translator. Li was the eldest child of his parents. His sister, Li Xiaolin, was born two years later. Both children were named after their parents by simply appending the middle character xiao to their names (literally meaning "little"), so Li Xiaopeng's name can be taken to mean "little Li Peng" or "Li Peng, Jr.". Both Li Xiaopeng and Li Xiaolin took after their father and studied electricity-related professions in university. He is a graduate of the North China Electric Power University.

In 1982, Li found work at the country's top institute specializing in the study of power generation. He was rapidly promoted in the institute and earned his professional engineer designation.  He studied for a brief stint at the University of Manitoba in Winnipeg, Manitoba, Canada.  In 1991, Li entered a company specializing in power generation, and became assistant to its chief executive, beginning his career in business.  He took up increasingly senior executive positions.  In April 1999 Li Xiaopeng was named chief executive of China Huaneng Group. He took the company to its IPO on the Hong Kong Stock Exchange a year later. After some mergers and acquisitions, China Huaneng emerged as one of the largest power generation companies in Asia.  Li Xiaopeng was nicknamed the "Asian King of Power". In 2002, Li was named chief executive of Huaneng Power International. Huaneng consistently ranked first in the "big five" state-owned power generation companies in China in terms of generation capacity.

Shanxi
In May 2008, Li was named to the Party Standing Committee of Shanxi province, joining the elite council of politicians in the province. In less than a month, on June 12, Li was named Vice-Governor of Shanxi, his portfolio included commerce, market regulation, foreign affairs, and tourism. In June 2010, Li was named Executive Vice-Governor. In December 2012, Li Xiaopeng was named acting Governor of Shanxi, replacing Wang Jun, who went on to become party chief of neighbouring Inner Mongolia. Li Xiaopeng's term as Governor has been marked with instability in the provincial party organization; between 2013 and 2014, several senior provincial officials fell as part of a corruption probe.

In January 2015, the Shanxi government website made changes to the "division of labour" among the highest officers of the provincial government, reducing Li's purview to only "oversee overall work of the provincial government." It was generally considered customary for the governor to also directly oversee the departments for supervision, audit, and state owned enterprise management (guoziwei), which is typically defined explicitly on the websites. Outside observers saw this move as an indication that Li Xiaopeng's power had been curtailed. During his governorship, he welcomed two new party secretaries, Wang Rulin and Luo Huining, while unable to ascend to the post of provincial party chief himself as was customarily expected in other Chinese provinces.

Li is an alternate member of the 18th Central Committee of the Chinese Communist Party, he is ranked last on the list, which is arranged by votes received in favour at the 18th Party Congress.

Minister of Transport
In September 2016, Li Xiaopeng was appointed as the Minister of Transport by the Standing Committee of the National People's Congress, and replaced Yang Chuantang.

See also
Li Xiaolin, Xiaopeng's sister

References

1959 births
Living people
Li Peng family
People's Republic of China politicians from Beijing
Chinese Communist Party politicians from Beijing
Alternate members of the 18th Central Committee of the Chinese Communist Party
Governors of Shanxi
Political office-holders in Tibet
Ministers of Transport of the People's Republic of China
North China Electric Power University alumni
Children of national leaders of China